Tanja Perec (born 8 June 1992) is a Croatian sports shooter. She competed in the women's 50 metre rifle three positions event at the 2016 Summer Olympics.

References

External links
 

1992 births
Living people
Croatian female sport shooters
Olympic shooters of Croatia
Shooters at the 2016 Summer Olympics
Place of birth missing (living people)
Shooters at the 2010 Summer Youth Olympics
Shooters at the 2015 European Games
European Games competitors for Croatia
21st-century Croatian women